The Buscaylet-de Monge 5/2 was a 1920s French single-seat, parasol-wing fighter prototype designed by Louis de Monge for the Buscaylet et Cie company.

Design and development
The 5/2 was based on de Monge's earlier Lumière-de Monge racer (possibly designated de Monge 5/1) and was of metal construction with both wood and metal skinning. The 5/2 was powered by a  Hispano-Suiza 8Fb inline piston engine. The parasol-wing fighter retained the ability inherited from the Lumière-de Monge to attach stub-wings to convert the aircraft to a sesquiplane. The aircraft was intended to use two forward-firing synchronised machine guns but they were not fitted to the prototype. The 5/2 was first flown in 1923, but after testing, it was assessed as too advanced for use and development was abandoned.

Specification

References

Bibliography

1920s French fighter aircraft
Single-engined tractor aircraft
High-wing aircraft
Aircraft first flown in 1923